Krzysztof Henryk Pawlak (born 12 February 1958 in Trzebiechów) is a retired Polish football player, who played for a few clubs, including Warta Poznań, Lech Poznań, KSC Lokeren (Belgium) and Trelleborgs FF Sweden.

Career

National team
He played for the Polish national team (31 matches) and was a participant at the 1986 FIFA World Cup.

International goal

Manager career
Pawlak later jumped on a coaching career and coached several clubs in Poland.

References

External links
 
 Profile & stats - Lokeren

1958 births
People from Zielona Góra County
Living people
Polish footballers
Poland international footballers
Polish football managers
Ekstraklasa players
Belgian Pro League players
Allsvenskan players
K.S.C. Lokeren Oost-Vlaanderen players
Warta Poznań players
1986 FIFA World Cup players
Lech Poznań players
Trelleborgs FF players
Expatriate footballers in Belgium
Expatriate footballers in Sweden
Warta Poznań managers
GKS Bełchatów managers
Poland national football team managers
Lech Poznań managers
Podbeskidzie Bielsko-Biała managers
GKP Gorzów Wielkopolski managers
Flota Świnoujście managers
Sportspeople from Lubusz Voivodeship
Association football defenders